Burton Salmon railway station served the village of Burton Salmon, North Yorkshire, England, from 1840 to 1959 on the York and North Midland Railway.

History 
The station was opened on 11 May 1840 by the York and North Midland Railway. It closed to passengers on 14 September 1959 and closed to goods on 3 June 1968.

References 

Disused railway stations in North Yorkshire
Railway stations in Great Britain opened in 1840
Railway stations in Great Britain closed in 1959
1840 establishments in England
1959 disestablishments in England